La Luna (Italian and Spanish for "the moon") is the seventh album recorded by English soprano Sarah Brightman in 2000.  It was released under license by Nemo Studios to Angel Records. The album combines pieces written by classical and modern composers.
It is the 17th top-selling classical album of the 2000s in the US, according to Nielsen SoundScan, and is Brightman's second highest seller in the country after her 1997 release Timeless/Time to Say Goodbye. Aside from the US, the album experienced its strongest sales in Asia, where it received a quintuple platinum certification in Taiwan and earned Brightman's first Gold award in Japan.

Album information 
The classical pieces are "How Fair This Place" ("Здесь хорошо") by Rachmaninov; "Figlio Perduto", which is based on Ludwig van Beethoven's Symphony No. 7 Op. 92, 2nd movement in A minor "Allegretto"; Solo Con Te (Handel - Dank Sei Dir, Herr); Aria "La Luna" from Opera Rusalka.
With La Luna, Brightman combined elements of her traditional operatic background with her newer style of pop music. "Hijo de la Luna" (translating to "Son of the Moon" in Spanish) is a cover originally performed by the Spanish synthpop band Mecano. Written by Ennio Morricone, "La Califfa" is the title track of the 1970 Italian film with the same name. The underlying concept of the album is the moon.

Track listing

Europe
This original European track listing is now out of print. All pressings now use the USA track listing, along with its versions of "This Love", "Here with Me", and "La Luna". It also replaces "How Fair This Spot" and "She Doesn't See Him" with the lyrically different "How Fair This Place" and "He Doesn't See Me". "La Luna" is performed in full soprano here compared to the more contemporary USA version and "First of May" is removed all together from later releases.

United States
La Luna was changed considerably for its US release. Song additions include "La Lune", "Winter in July", and Brightman's covers of the Procol Harum classic "A Whiter Shade of Pale" and Henry Mancini's "Moon River". Song changes include replacing the European release's versions of "How Fair This Spot" and "She Doesn't See Him" with the lyrically different "How Fair This Place" and "He Doesn't See Me", along with an extended version of "Serenade" and a more contemporary "La Luna". EMI later used La Luna US version for their SACD 5.1 release of the album.

Singles
"Scarborough Fair" was released as the album's lead single in January 2000. It became the biggest hit of Brightman's career in Asia and was a chart topper in China and Taiwan, propelling the sales of La Luna throughout the continent. Brightman brought the song renewed popularity in eastern markets through her successful adaptation.

"A Whiter Shade of Pale" was released as the album's third single on early 2001. The single debuted at number thirty eight on the Japanese Singles Chart, and due to its massive airplay in the country, the song reached the top of the International Singles Chart, staying there for nineteen weeks. It is the tenth single with most cumulative weeks at the No. 1 spot in the history of this chart. The song was certified twice Gold by the Recording Industry Association of Japan. The first time, as a CD single, denoting shipments of over 50,000 copies, and the second time, in 2011, as a digital single, denoting sales of 100,000 copies. In the United States, the song was Brightman's first entry into the Billboard's top Dance/Club Play Songs chart.

The second and fourth singles from the album, "La Luna" (2000) and "Here with Me" (2001) were released in Brazil and Europe respectively in a limited number of pressings.

Charts and certifications

Weekly charts

Year-end charts

Certifications and sales

See also
 La Luna: Live in Concert
 La Luna World Tour

References

2000 albums
Sarah Brightman albums
Albums produced by Frank Peterson
East West Records albums
Classical crossover albums